Joffre Cogeneration Plant is a natural gas power station owned by Heartland Generation Ltd. (40%), Capital Power (40%) and Nova Chemicals (20%). The plant is located in Joffre, Alberta, Canada, near Red Deer. The plant is primarily used to supply steam to the adjacent Nova Chemicals processing plant.

Description
The plant consists of:
 Two Westinghouse CTSD W501 F Gas Turbines
 Two Nooter/Eriksen Heat Recovery Steam Generators
 One Toshiba Steam Turbine

References

Lacombe County
Natural gas-fired power stations in Alberta
Power stations in Alberta